Uzebba is a Town in the Owan local council of Edo State, Nigeria. Uzebba, along with its neighbouring towns and villages, Avboisi, Okpuje, Ukhuse-Osi, Ukhuse-Oke in Owan, Etsakor, and Akoko Edo, are known as Afemai. They collectively make up Edo-North Senatorial District.

Populated places in Edo State